Medamud (from ) was a settlement in ancient Egypt. Its present-day territory is located about 8 km east-north from Luxor.

The Temple of Montu was located here. It was excavated by Fernand Bisson de la Roque in 1925, who identified several structures dedicated to the war-god Montu.

Temple of Montu
See article Temple of Montu.

A simple Temple of Montu existed here already towards the end of the Old Kingdom, or during the First Intermediate Period. It was surrounded by a wall. It is now located below the present temple.

There were two pylons, one behind the other and, beyond them, there was a double cave sanctuary, the underground chambers of which were marked with mounds on the surface. These mounds of earth probably functioned as 'primeval mounds'.

During the Middle Kingtdom's 12th Dynasty, the old temple was completely rebuilt on a bigger scale.

Further building and renovation continued well into the time of the Roman Empire.

See also 
 List of ancient Egyptian sites

References 

Archaeological sites in Egypt
Former populated places in Egypt